The Joralemon Street Tunnel, originally the Brooklyn–Battery Tunnel, is a pair of tubes carrying the IRT Lexington Avenue Line of the New York City Subway under the East River between Bowling Green Park in Manhattan and Brooklyn Heights in Brooklyn, New York City. The Joralemon Street Tunnel was an extension of the Interborough Rapid Transit Company (IRT)'s first subway line from the Bowling Green station in Manhattan to the IRT Eastern Parkway Line in Brooklyn. 

The interiors are lined with cast-iron "rings" formed with concrete. During the tunnel's construction, a house at 58 Joralemon Street in Brooklyn was converted into a ventilation building and emergency exit.

The Joralemon Street Tunnel was the first underwater subway tunnel connecting Manhattan and Brooklyn. It was built by the IRT as part of Contract 2, which the IRT signed with the Rapid Transit Commission in 1902. Construction commenced in 1903 and the tubes were completed by 1907, despite various construction accidents and engineering errors that required part of the tunnel to be rebuilt. The first train ran through the Joralemon Street Tunnel in November 1907, and the tunnel opened for passenger service on January 9, 1908. It was listed on the National Register of Historic Places in 2006.

Description
The Joralemon Street Tunnel, consisting of two parallel tubes, crosses the East River, connecting the New York City boroughs of Manhattan in the west and Brooklyn in the east. Completed in 1908 for the Interborough Rapid Transit Company (IRT), it was the first subway tunnel between the two boroughs, and was built as part of Contract 2 of the first New York City Subway line. The tubes extend between South Ferry in Lower Manhattan and Joralemon Street in Brooklyn Heights, Brooklyn, with the route of the tunnel curving at either bank of the river. The primary engineer for the tunnel was William Barclay Parsons, who designed most of the early IRT system, while Clifford Milburn Holland served as the assistant engineer. The New York Tunnel Company was the primary contractor. When completed, it was known as the Brooklyn–Battery Tunnel, a name subsequently used for a vehicular tunnel slightly to the south.

Both tubes have a maximum gradient of 3.1 percent. About  of the tunnel in Brooklyn is above the water level of the river. While the Manhattan end of the tunnels was constructed through solid rock, the Brooklyn end was constructed through sandy ground.

The steelwork for Contract 2 tunnels, including the Joralemon Street Tubes, was manufactured by the American Bridge Company. The rings within the rocky sections, and within the segments of the tunnel above mean high water, generally weigh less than those placed within sandy ground or underneath the riverbed. After the rings were placed, they were covered with concrete, and bench walls with cable ducts were placed aside each tube. Piping and drainage systems were also installed. Pilings were sunk for additional reinforcement.

Associated structures 
The Manhattan end of the tunnel is the Bowling Green station of the IRT Lexington Avenue Line. North of Bowling Green, the subway runs under Broadway to connect to the original subway line. The Brooklyn end is at Joralemon and Clinton Streets in Brooklyn, where a cut-and-cover tunnel connects to the Borough Hall station of the IRT Eastern Parkway Line.  

Two construction shafts were built for the tunnel: one in Manhattan at South Ferry, and the other in Brooklyn at Henry and Joralemon Streets. The South Ferry construction shaft became a ventilation shaft and consists of a  enclosure inside the Battery. However, the Henry Street construction shaft was infilled. A ventilation and emergency exit shaft was built inside a row house at 58 Joralemon Street, near Willow Street. 58 Joralemon Street was an actual house, built in 1847, but was purchased by the IRT in 1907 and gutted.

History

Planning 
Planning for the city's first subway line dates to the Rapid Transit Act, authorized by the New York State Legislature in 1894. The subway plans were drawn up by a team of engineers led by William Barclay Parsons, chief engineer of the Rapid Transit Commission (RTC). It called for a subway line from New York City Hall in lower Manhattan to the Upper West Side, where two branches would lead north into the Bronx. A plan was formally adopted in 1897. The Rapid Transit Subway Construction Company (RTSCC), organized by John B. McDonald and funded by August Belmont Jr., signed Contract 1 with the RTC in February 1900, in which it would construct the subway and maintain a 50-year operating lease from the opening of the line. Belmont incorporated the IRT in April 1902 to operate the subway. 

A subway under the southernmost section of Broadway between the Battery and City Hall was not included in Contract 1. Several days after Contract 1 was signed, the Board of Rapid Transit Railroad Commissioners instructed Parsons to evaluate the feasibility of extending the subway south to South Ferry and then to Brooklyn. On January 24, 1901, the Board adopted a route that would extend the subway from City Hall to the Long Island Rail Road (LIRR)'s Flatbush Avenue terminal station (now known as Atlantic Terminal) in Brooklyn, via a tunnel under the East River, then running under Joralemon Street, Fulton Street, and Flatbush Avenue in Brooklyn to Atlantic Terminal. It was estimated that this second route would cost $9 million (equivalent to $ million in ), which the RTC could not yet fully fund. However, the RTC expected that there would be competition for the route, which connected two large business districts and the city's two most populous boroughs. The Brooklyn Rapid Transit Company, which monopolized surface and elevated transit in Brooklyn, would be obliged to bid to maintain its monopoly. The Board also knew that Belmont would submit a low bid to retain control of underground rapid transit for himself and his construction company. Contract 2, giving a lease of 35 years, was executed between the commission and the Rapid Transit Construction Company on September 11, 1902.

Construction 
Construction on the Manhattan side began on March 4, 1903, and on the Brooklyn side on July 10, 1903. While the RTC had allocated $2 million to the tubes' construction (equivalent to $ million in ), the project was estimated to cost $10 million (equivalent to $ million in ) by November 1903. Construction shafts were dug at South Ferry and Joralemon Street. Six tunneling shields were driven: two proceeding east from Manhattan and two each proceeding west and east from Brooklyn. All of the headings were driven within a pressurized environment. An upper lock gave workers access to the heading, while a lower lock allowed spoils to be extracted from the excavation and through the shafts on either side. The work was performed by three groups of men, each working eight-hour shifts. 

After the shields were driven, temporary wooden beams were placed to reinforce the excavations until the cast-iron tubes were assembled. The cast iron lining was assembled via a hydraulically powered, traveling device with a "radial arm"; the device was supported on brackets that ran along the completed section of the lining. Once it had been positioned, the radial arm would lift and orient a plate into position. Three workers would bolt the plates to the already assembled lining, while a fourth would operate the device. Afterward, a compressed-air grouting machine would squeeze grout into small holes within the lining, filling the spaces between the rock and the cast-iron rings. The holes in the lining were then plugged. Some of the cast-iron plates were cracked while they were placed, but Parsons maintained that the tubes were safe.  

The excavations caused shifting of sandy soil, which damaged some buildings in Brooklyn along the tunnel's route, including the house of the Brooklyn borough president. In June 1904, the RTC said the city was not responsible for repairs to the houses, although contractors were digging another shaft to relieve air pressure in the excavation. The shafts at Garden Place and at Henry Street were sealed, and new shafts at Furman Street on the waterfront were being constructed, by the end of 1904. The property damage led the New York City government to pay out monetary compensation starting in mid-1906. Numerous other accidents occurred during the course of construction. In March 1905, one of the tubes suddenly lost pressure in a "blowout", propelling a worker through the mud and into the air, although he survived. That December, a blast caused the tunnel to cave-in at the Battery, though no one died. A cave-in occurred in one of the tubes in August 1906, and two months later, another blast killed one worker. Another issue was the need to create a new ventilation shaft on the Brooklyn side after the construction shaft was sealed; the IRT unsuccessfully attempted to take property on Hicks and Furman Streets. By 1907, the IRT had bought a house at 58 Joralemon Street to serve as the ventilation plant.  

Continuing with the excavations, the contractors found the remains of a ship under Joralemon Street in March 1905. By that August, the excavations had reached the midpoint of the riverbed. During this time, Parsons and his successor George S. Rice discovered that the ceilings of the tubes had flattened downward; trains could still run through the tunnels, but the roofs would be scraped at high speeds. Less urgently, the tunnels in Brooklyn had descended beneath the specified gradient, which if uncorrected would result in an uneven grade. These difficulties had come to the attention of mayor George B. McClellan Jr. by mid-1906. To prevent further delays, contractor New York Tunnel Company chose to proceed, with plans to rebuild the defective tunnel sections later. Parsons blamed the contractor for the defective tube ceilings, stating that the New York Tunnel Company had allowed the quicksand above the tubes to settle, although the contractor denied responsibility.  

The two sections of the northern tube were holed-through on December 15, 1906, followed by the southern tube on March 1, 1907. The New York Tunnel Company became insolvent that May, and a receiver was appointed to oversee the completion of the tunnel. By that July, the city's Public Service Commission ordered that additional shifts of workers be hired for the Joralemon project so that test trains could start running through the tunnels within three months. The first test train, carrying officials, reporters, and construction engineers, ran through the Joralemon Street Tunnel to Brooklyn at 12:40 p.m. on November 27, 1907.

Operation

The Joralemon Street Tunnel and the Borough Hall station opened to the public on January 9, 1908, with ceremonies, firecrackers, and a musical performance on the steps of Brooklyn Borough Hall. Initially, the tunnel was served by express trains along both the West Side (now the Broadway–Seventh Avenue Line to Van Cortlandt Park–242nd Street) and East Side (now the Lenox Avenue Line). The express trains, running to Atlantic Avenue, had their northern terminus at 242nd Street or West Farms (180th Street). Lenox local trains to 145th Street served the tunnel during late nights. In Brooklyn, service proceeded beneath Joralemon, Fulton, and Willoughby Streets, originally terminating at Atlantic Avenue. The opening of the Joralemon Street Tunnel, as well as the completion of the Williamsburg Bridge and Manhattan Bridge to the north, relieved traffic from the Brooklyn Bridge and from East River ferries, which previously had provided the only passenger service between Manhattan and Brooklyn. 

The Dual Contracts were formalized in early 1913, specifying new lines or expansions to be built by the IRT and the BRT. As part of the Dual Contracts, the IRT extended the Lexington Avenue Line north of Grand Central–42nd Street, dividing the original IRT line into an "H"-shaped system. The "H" system opened in 1918, and all Joralemon Street Tunnel services were sent via the Lexington Avenue Line. The following year, the Clark Street Tunnel opened north of the Joralemon Street Tunnel, providing service from the newly extended Broadway–Seventh Avenue Line to the IRT's Brooklyn line. Another tunnel, the Montague Street Tunnel, was built north of the Joralemon Street Tunnel as part of the Dual Contracts, opening in 1920 as part of the BRT system. Also in 1920, the Eastern Parkway Line was extended east of Atlantic Avenue; the Joralemon Street Tunnel services, which had previously served all stops on the Eastern Parkway Line, became express services.   

In the latter half of the 20th century, several derailments occurred in the Joralemon Street Tunnel. A Brooklyn-bound train derailed during the morning rush hour of January 1, 1965, blocking service for half a day, although no one was harmed. During the evening rush hour of March 17, 1984, another train derailed with 1,500 passengers while traveling over a track that was being repaired, but again, no one was killed or seriously injured.

The Joralemon Street Tunnel was added to the National Register of Historic Places in 2006. It was one of seven East River subway tunnels flooded on October 29, 2012, as Hurricane Sandy's storm surge inundated Lower Manhattan. The Metropolitan Transportation Authority prioritized draining and restoring service to the Joralemon Street Tunnel and Rutgers Street Tunnel, which carried some of the system's busiest routes. The storm water was cleared from the tunnel two days afterward, and the tunnel reopened within the week. The tunnels were more extensively repaired during 2016 and 2017 for $75 million.

References

Notes

Citations

Sources

External links

1908 establishments in New York City
Buildings and structures on the National Register of Historic Places in Manhattan
Crossings of the East River
Interborough Rapid Transit Company
New York City Subway infrastructure
Railroad tunnels in New York City
Railway buildings and structures on the National Register of Historic Places in New York City
Railway tunnels on the National Register of Historic Places
Tunnels completed in 1908
Tunnels in Manhattan